Edna is an unincorporated town in Lyon County, Iowa, United States.
Edna is located on the western border of Liberal Township in Lyon County.

The town consists of about 10 houses, a couple of outbuildings and sheds, and in the center of town stands the Edna Grain Elevator.

History
Edna was founded in the 1800s; its population was 28 in 1902, and 35 in 1925.

References

Unincorporated communities in Iowa
Unincorporated communities in Lyon County, Iowa